Kadın (English title: Woman) is a Turkish drama television series based on the 2013 Japanese drama Woman, starring Özge Özpirinçci, Caner Cindoruk and Bennu Yıldırımlar. It premiered on Fox on October 24, 2017.

The series was ended on February 4, 2020 after 81 episodes and three seasons.

Plot

This series follows the life of Bahar, a young widow with two children. She was abandoned by her mother when she was 8 and later loses her grandparents. Soon, Bahar meets Sarp, with whom she falls madly in love, but loses Sarp too as well after some years together. Bahar is left alone with her two children, Nisan and Doruk. Together, they turn life into a game, poverty into fun, and absence into joy. She believes that when one has a smile on their face, their heart also responds with a smile. Sometimes, she talks to Sarp's photograph about all her troubles, remembering their past life.

Bahar has given up her life for her children. Her mother, Hatice comes back into her life after 20 years. Bahar wants to get close to her mother again but her half-sister, Şirin prevents her mother and sister from bonding. In order to protect Şirin's mental well-being, Hatice turns her back even though Bahar needs her. Bahar is helped by Hatice's husband, Enver and best friend, Yeliz. Soon, Bahar moves to new apartment and meets Arif and Ceyda. Arif is the son of Yusuf, the owner of Bahar's flat. Ceyda initially refuses Bahar but later helps her to survive.

Bahar finds out that she has aplastic anemia and needs a bone marrow transplant to save her life. She attempts to hide her condition from everyone due to her financial and social problems, but everyone soon learns about this and finds out that Şirin's bone marrow is suitable for transplant to Bahar.

Meanwhile, Sarp is shown to be alive, pretending as Alp Karahan. He is married to Pırıl and has twin children. He is told by Pırıl's father, Suat that Bahar and her children died 4 years ago, which is a lie made up by Şirin. To prove this, Suat makes fake graves and shows them to Sarp who believed that. Soon, Sarp meets Şirin. It's revealed that Şirin was in love with Sarp 4 years ago and she was the reason for Sarp's ferry accident. Suat kidnaps Şirin to stop Sarp from learning that Bahar is alive.

Bahar's condition worsens and she is admitted to a hospital. Arif now has feelings for Bahar, proposes to her. Doruk sees Sarp and calls him father. After meeting Enver, Sarp learns that Bahar and his kids are alive. He is shocked, realizing that Suat had lied to him. He reunites with Nisan and Doruk and brings Şirin back for Bahar's treatment. Bahar recovers and meets Sarp after years. However, She ignores him, after learning truth. One night, Sarp escapes with Bahar and kids to save them from Nezir's henchmen. Yeliz is shot to death by henchmens and Bahar lives in Pırıl's home with her kids. Bahar breaksdown learning Yeliz's death and tries to elope with Nisan and Doruk, but fails. Sarp reveals to Bahar how fell out of the ferry and how Şirin and Suat had lied to him about Bahar and kids. Bahar is shocked and forgives him.

Bahar, Hatice, Sarp and Arif meet with a tragic accident and Hatice dies. Șirin secretly closes the flow rate of the IV line connected to a sleeping Sarp and kills him. Şirin blames Arif for their death. Shocked, Bahar completes the last rites of Sarp and Hatice while Arif gets arrested.

3 months later, Bahar is living peacefully with her children. Arif is released from jail. Enver misses Hatice and moves into a new house with Şirin in Bahar's apartment. Șirin brainwashes Nisan and Doruk that Arif had killed Sarp and Hatice on purpose, but in vain. Meanwhile, Şirin gets a waiter job at a restaurant belonging to Emre, who was Ceyda's ex-fiancé. It's revealed that Arda (Ceyda's autistic son) is not Ceyda and Emre's son. They meet their son, Satilmiș, but Ceyda refuses to accept him. Satilmiș secretly earns money to keep Arda with them. Finding out this, Ceyda breaks down and accepts him.

Ceyda takes care of disabled Raif. Raif's mother, Fazilet, who is a writer, invites Bahar to share her story. Fazilet writes Bahar's story, naming the book Kadın (Woman). Bahar is surprised to see her book.

Soon, Arif finds that Sarp was killed by Șirin after hearing her voice record. Once Bahar learns this, she follows Şirin, who is staying at a hotel. She calls Enver to meet her, and Șirin gets arrested by the Police, who admit her to mental hospital. Meanwhile, Arif and Bahar's relationship gets stronger when Raif and Ceyda fall in love. Bahar-Arif and Ceyda-Raif get married on same day. Bahar, Arif, Ceyda, Raif, Enver, Nisan and Doruk celebrate together happily.

At the ceremony of introducing the author of the book Kadın (Woman), Bahar tells how she managed her life while facing so much hardship. Șirin reads Bahar's book and regrets what she did to Bahar. Finally, Bahar and her kids get praised by the world.

Cast

Main 
Özge Özpirinçci as Bahar Çeşmeli – Hatice's daughter; Enver's step-daughter; Şirin's half-sister; Sarp's first widow; Arif's wife; Nisan and Doruk's mother
 Su Burcu Yazgı Coşkun as Child Bahar
Caner Cindoruk as Sarp Çeşmeli / Alp Karahan – Julide's son; Bahar and Pırıl's husband; Nisan, Doruk, Ali and Ümer's father
Bennu Yıldırımlar as Hatice Sarıkadı – Enver's wife; Bahar and Șirin's mother; Nisan and Doruk's grandmother
Seray Kaya as Şirin Sarıkadı – Hatice and Enver's daughter; Bahar's half-sister; Sarp's obsessive lover
Şerif Erol as Enver Sarıkadı – Hatice's widower; Şirin's father; Bahar's step-father; Nisan and Doruk's step-grandfather
Feyyaz Duman as Arif Kara – Yusuf's son; Kismet's half-brother; Bahar's husband; Nisan and Doruk's adoptive father
Kübra Süzgün as Nisan Çeşmeli – Bahar and Sarp's daughter; Arif's adopted daughter; Doruk's sister; Ali and Ümer's half-sister
 Dila Nil Yıldırım as Baby Nisan
Ali Semi Sefil as Doruk Çeşmeli – Bahar and Sarp's son; Arif's adopted son; Nisan's brother; Ali and Ümer's half-brother

Supporting 
Gökçe Eyüboğlu as Ceyda Aşçıoğlu: Bahar's neighbor and friend; Raif's wife; Emre's ex-fiancée; Satilmiş's mother; Arda's adoptive mother
Ayça Erturan as Yeliz Ünsal: Bahar's best friend; Asli and Tunç's mother
Sinan Helvacı as Raif Aşçıoğlu: Fazilet's son; Ceyda's husband; Satilmiș and Arda's adoptive father 
Hümeyra as Fazilet Aşçıoğlu: A writer; Raif's mother
Ece Özdikici / Pinar Çağlar Gençtürk as Dr. Jale Demir: Bahar's doctor; Musa's wife; Bora's mother
Ahu Yağtu as Pırıl Çeşmeli: Suat's daughter; Mert's ex-fiancée; Sarp's second widow; Ali and Ümer's mother
Devrim Özder Akın as Musa Demir: Jale's husband; Bora's father
Demir Beyitolgu as Bora Demir: Musa and Jale's son; Doruk's best friend
Elif Naz Emre as Elif: Nisan's classmate 
Ayça Melek Gülerçe as Așli: Yeliz's daughter; Tunç's sister; Nisan and Doruk's friend
Kaan Şener as Tunç: Yeliz's son; Așli's brother; Nisan and Doruk's friend
Mehetan Parıltı as Satilmiş Aşçıoğlu: Emre and Ceyda's son; Raif's adopted son; Arda's adopted brother; Nisan and Doruk's friend
Kerem Yozgatli as Arda Aşçıoğlu: Ceyda and Raif's adopted son; Satilmiş's adopted brother; Nisan and Doruk's friend (2018–2020)
Eren İkizler as Ali Çeșmeli: Sarp and Pırıl's son; Nisan and Doruk's half-brother
Emre İkizler as Ümer Çeșmeli: Sarp and Pırıl's son; Nisan and Doruk's half-brother
Hakan Kurtaş as Cem Bey: Kismet’s ex-husband; Bahar and Ceyda’s former boss (2019-2020)
Tuğçe Altuğ as Kismet Avcı: A lawyer; Yusuf's daughter; Arif's half-sister; Cem's ex-wife
Oktay Gürsoy as Dr. Sinan: Jale's friend; Bahar's doctor
Yaşar Uzel as Yusuf Kara: Arif and Kismet's father; Bahar's landlord
Ahmet Rıfat Şungar as Emre: Idil's cousin; Ceyda's ex-fiancé; Satilmiş's father
Sinem Uçar as Ferdane: Bahar's friend and well wisher in her old workplace
Busra İl as Idil: Emre's cousin; Şirin's enemy
Sahra Şaş as Berşan: Arif's ex-fiancée
Resit Berker Enhos as Ziya: Şirin's art teacher
Semi Sırtıkkızıl as Levent: Şirin's fiancé
Gazanfer Ündüz as Suat: Pırıl's father; Ali and Ümer's grandfather
Şebnem Köstem as Jülide Çesmeli: Sarp's mother; Nisan, Doruk, Ali and Ümer's grandmother
Hakan Karahan as Nezir Korkmaz: Mert's father; A head of underworld
Eray Cezayirlioglu as Mert Korkmaz: Nezir's son; Pırıl's ex-fiancé
Rana Cabbar as Seyfullah: Umran's father
Caner Çandarlı as Münir: Sarp's bodyguard
Melih Çardak as Hikmet: Ceyda's boss; Umran's husband
Canan Karanlık as Ümran: Hikmet's wife
Selim Aygün as Peyami: Hikmet's secretary
Sevinç Meşe as Füsun: Sinan's girlfriend

Series overview

International broadcasting

  In Arabia, it airs under the title Imraa on MTV from September 3, 2020.
  In Bangladesh, it airs under the title, Bahar, on Deepto TV.
  In Greece, it airs under the title Μια ζωή on ANT1.
  In Latvia, it airs under the title Bahāras dzīves līkloči on STV Pirmā.
  In Romania, it airs under the title Femeie în înfruntarea destinului on Happy Channel.
  In Spain, it airs under the title Mujer on Antena 3 from July 7, 2020.
  In Slovakia, it aired two seasons under the title Sila ženy on TV Doma from March 18, 2019.
  In Sri Lanka, it aired two seasons under the title Kisa on Sirasa TV from August 24, 2020 to December 3, 2021.
 In Sri Lanka, it also remaded as Aeya on Swarnavahini from October 22, 2019 to September 4, 2021.
  In Vietnam, it airs under the title Trái tim phụ nữ on VTV3.
 August 13, 2020 – December 28, 2020 (Season 1)
 July 19, 2021 – November 26, 2021 (Season 2)
 November 29, 2021 – February 11, 2022 (Season 3)
  In Ukraine, it airs under the title Жінка on 1+1 Video.
  In Ethiopia, it aired under the title Yaltefeta Hilm on Kana TV from February 23, 2019 to October 4, 2020.
  In Lithuania, it aired under the title Moteris on TV1 from April 6, 2021 to 2022
  In Hungary, it aired one season under the title Egy csodálatos asszony on RTL Klub from August 3, 2020 to December 18, 2020.
  In India, it airs under the title Woman on MX Player

Awards and nominations

References

External links 
  
 

2017 Turkish television series debuts
2020 Turkish television series endings
Turkish drama television series
Fox (Turkish TV channel) original programming
Television series by Med Yapım
Television series by MF Yapım
Turkish television series based on Japanese television series
Turkish-language television shows
Television shows set in Istanbul